Qaraçay is a village and municipality in the Quba Rayon of Azerbaijan. It has a population of 1,245.

References

Populated places in Quba District (Azerbaijan)